Aplomera is a genus of flies in the family Empididae.

Species
A. brachystoma Philippi, 1865
A. brevimana Collin, 1933
A. chilensis Bezzi, 1909
A. conspicua Collin, 1933
A. dichroa Collin, 1933
A. difficilis Collin, 1933
A. gayi Macquart, 1838
A. gymnopoda Bezzi, 1905
A. lineata Collin, 1933
A. macrocera Bigot, 1888
A. medialis Collin, 1933
A. notogramma Bezzi, 1905
A. nudipes Macquart, 1838
A. pachymera Macquart, 1838
A. particularis Collin, 1933
A. schrottkyi Bezzi, 1909
A. spinulosa Philippi, 1865
A. varasi Brèthes, 1916

References

Empidoidea genera
Empididae
Taxa named by Pierre-Justin-Marie Macquart